Steven Floyd Novak(born September 16, 1955) is an American television director and producer and is currently working at WGN-TV Chicago. Some highlights of Novak's career include two Emmys, Stories of Hope: Facing Breast Cancer and Overall directing of live and live to tape programming, and a Telly Award for WGN:Classics Bozo, Gar and Ray. Novak is currently the president of the Chicago/Midwest chapter of the National Academy of Television Arts & Sciences (NATAS).

Novak was born September 16, 1955 in Chicago, Illinois. He grew up in Rogers Park, and graduated from Sullivan High School In 1973. He went to Northeastern Illinois University from 1973 to 1976 graduating with a degree in Speech and Performing arts with an emphasis in Mass Communication, and a minor in History (Pop. Culture).

Career 
Novak began his career in the media industry at WGN in 1976 as a radio logger, keeping track of the times that commercials aired during WGN AM radio broadcasts. In 1977 he got promoted to a film librarian, managing all content that WGN had the rights to. In 1978 he went on to program schooling and screened various episodes of shows that aired on WGN. The year after he became an assistant director in WGN's production department working on news and sports. In 1984 Novak left WGN to work as a director at Telemation Productions working on tele-conferencing, commercial productions, and corporate video. While at Telemation he won 3 Huston International Film Awards, and a number of Telly Awards for writing. In 1993 Novak returned to WGN Television where he became a director of the Nine O’Clock news, and the Bozo Show, a WGN-TV children's show. While at WGN Novak worked on Chicago Bulls, Cubs, White Sox, and Blackhawks coverage, as well as many television specials, including the Chicago Auto Show, 4 July, and New Year's coverages. He produced and directed many of the Championship rallies for winning Chicago sports teams, such as the White Sox 2004 victory, and the Blackhawks 2011, 2013 and 2015 wins. He won two Emmys, 1 for Stories of Hope: Facing Breast Cancer and 1 for overall directing of live and live to tape programming, and a Telly Award for WGN:Classics Bozo, Gar and Ray. In 2003 he joined the National Academy of Television Arts and Sciences, and has been on the Board of Governors ever since. In 2015 he was elected president of the Chicago/Midwest chapter of NATAS to finish the term of the previous president who stepped down.

References

Northeastern Illinois University alumni
1955 births
Living people
American television directors
American television producers